Highbury Hall, now a Grade II* listed building, was commissioned as his Birmingham residence by Joseph Chamberlain in 1878, two years after he became member of parliament for Birmingham. It took its name from the Highbury area of London, where Chamberlain had lived as a child. The architect was John Henry Chamberlain (no relation), who incorporated much terracotta decoration.

History
Joseph Chamberlain lived in Highbury from 1880 until his death in 1914. Beatrice Webb described the house as being very dark and gloomy. Chamberlain was able to fill it with the gifts he was presented with during his years as Colonial Secretary. His local political allies attended dinners at the house on Saturday evenings and, in that way, Chamberlain was able to exert influence over local developments. Adjacent to the house were Chamberlain's famous orchid houses.  From there, a supply of orchids was sent every few days to his London residence when Parliament was sitting. The gardens were magnificent, and included a lake: Chamberlain supervised their construction closely. 
  
During World War I, Highbury Hall was used as a hospital annex and home for disabled soldiers. It was given to trustees in 1919 by his elder son, Austen Chamberlain, and it then passed to the Corporation of Birmingham in 1932, when it was used as a home for elderly women. In 1984, it was restored by Birmingham City Council, and is now used as a conference centre and occasional restaurant. The living rooms and bedrooms are open to viewing by clients.

The grounds of the hall now form Highbury Park, a publicly accessible area of Grade II listed parkland.

Future plans
In 2016 the Chamberlain Highbury Trust took over the site from Birmingham City Council on a long leasehold. An £8 million fundraising campaign was launched in 2018 to restore the building and parkland. The plans aim to open Highbury to the public for the first time, creating an exhibition on the Chamberlains' lives and history of the hall and a café, as well as maintaining spaces for weddings and conferences.

References

Further reading
: a detailed account of life in the house during Chamberlain's time.

External links

 The Chamberlain Highbury Trust

Houses in Birmingham, West Midlands
Grade II* listed buildings in Birmingham
Moseley